Erasure in blazon, the language of heraldry, is the tearing off of part of a charge, leaving a jagged edge of it remaining. In blazons the term is most often found in its adjectival form, erased, and is usually applied to animate charges, most often heads or other body parts.

The term erased is most often used of an animal's head, when the neck is depicted with a ragged edge as if forcibly torn from the body.  Erased heads are distinct from those couped, in that the first are left with a jagged edge, while the second have a straight edge, as if cut with a sword.

John Craig's dictionary of 1854 says: 

When a tree or other plant is shown uprooted, with the bare roots showing, it is called eradicated.

Forms of erasure

There are different traditions for the erasing of heads. For instance, with the head of a bear, whether couped or erased, in English heraldry the separation is done horizontally under the neck, which is not lost, whereas in Scottish heraldry the usual practice is for the head to be separated from the body vertically, without keeping the neck attached to it.

Gallery

See also
Cabossed
Heads in heraldry

References

Heraldry